John Paulo Bagnas Nase (born September 14, 1994), better known by his stage name Pablo (formerly Sejun), is a Filipino  singer, dancer, songwriter, and producer. He is the leader, vocalist, main rapper and chief songwriter of the Filipino boy band SB19 managed under ShowBT Philippines.

Early life 
Pablo was born on September 14, 1994 in Imus, Cavite, Philippines. He is the second-born child along with two sisters and two brothers. In high school, he served as a point guard in their basketball varsity team. He entered college at the Polytechnic University of the Philippines, and while on his senior year, he worked as a call center representative. After graduating with Bachelor of Arts in English degree, Pablo worked as a data analyst in Makati. He had the passion for performing in his early years but was afraid of sharing it to others except to his inner circles. Pablo's inspirations were Filipino hip hop artists Loonie and Gloc-9. He also admired the styles of Bigbang's G-Dragon, Ez Mil, Eminem, and NF.

Career

Pre-debut: ShowBT auditions 
In 2016, Pablo auditioned for ShowBT Philippines after meeting their Korean trainer at a Korean musical. He was being subtle in expressing his skills in performing because he did not want to show it to other people. However, Pablo still pursued performing as it was his passion. He was the first member of SB19 to audition in the talent agency. After passing the auditions, he started training for two years and became part of NARRA trainee group. Due to the pressure in the training program, he resigned from his work as a data analyst to focus on the training. The trainee group performed at various events in the agency.

2018-2021: SB19 debut, songwriting and production 
Of all of the members of SB19, Pablo trained the longest. Implementing the Korean idol training system, ShowBT Philippines conducted evaluations weekly by removing underperforming trainees. Pablo received a slot for the final line-up for SB19 as the band's leader and rapper. On 26 October 2018, Pablo debuted with fellow members Josh, Stell, Justin, and Ken with "Tilaluha" written by Pablo himself. Being a leader, Pablo always focused on the idea of "always choosing to be kind" reminding their fans and members to be humble always. 

Pablo served as the main songwriter of the band's songs participating on all of the singles such as "Go Up" (2019) and "Alab (Burning)" (2020). Pablo was also credited as the lyricist of the boy band's debut Get in the Zone (2020) released on 31 July 2020. SB19's debut extended play Pagsibol (EP) released on 22 July 2021 was co-produced and written by Pablo.

2022: Solo debut 
On 28 January 2022, Pablo released his first solo track "La Luna" (2022) under Sony Music Philippines. The song focused about his feelings and beliefs and acceptance of shortcomings free from society's unrealistic and unhealthy expectations.

Pablo started his career in producing outside SB19 with hip-hop group PLAN B's R&B song "Love" released on 13 April 2022.

Discography

As lead artist

Production credits

Videography

Music video

Awards and nominations

References 

SB19 members
1994 births
Living people
Filipino singer-songwriters
English-language singers from the Philippines
21st-century Filipino male singers
Filipino male pop singers
Filipino male dancers
Filipino male models
Filipino dance musicians
Sony Music Philippines artists
ShowBT Entertainment artists